The Knowle and Dorridge rail crash was a fatal rail crash that occurred at Dorridge railway station in the West Midlands, England, on 15 August 1963. Three people died in the crash after a signalman's error routed a small freight train into the path of an express passenger train which slowed but could not stop before colliding with it.

The express was a Birmingham Pullman service travelling from Birmingham Snow Hill to London Paddington, having departed at 1pm. The freight train movement in Dorridge station (formerly called Knowle and Dorridge) was a routine shunting manoeuvre, one that often occurred both before or after the express train had passed through the station.

The Pullman was 9 coaches long, and was hauled by an 11-month-old diesel hydraulic Class 52 "Western" locomotive, No. 1040 Western Queen. The freight train was formed (from the London end) of a  hopper wagon, a pannier tank steam locomotive, a  brake van, an empty bogie flatcar, and a bogie flatcar loaded with Land Rover vehicles.

The crash occurred in fine dry weather, at around 1.10 pm. The express was travelling at its usual speed of around  approaching the station when the driver noticed the Knowle and Dorridge distant signal at caution. The locomotive struck the loaded flat car crushing the cab, but without derailing. Two freight cars were derailed, with the rest pushed  down the track.

All four men on the freight train, the driver, fireman, shunter and guard, managed to jump clear before the collision. The driver, co-driver and second man on the express locomotive all died.

It was found that the signalman at Knowle and Dorridge signal box had forgotten he had signalled that the up main line was clear for the express train and allowed the freight train onto the same line, in its path. On receiving a "train approaching" signal for the express, he realised his mistake, but was only able to alert the freight train by red flag. Although it braked to a halt, it could not be cleared from the main line in time to avoid the collision.

As a contributory factor to the crash, it was found that the signalman, in clearing the express, had disregarded a standing order known as Regulation 4A, governing the safe operation of signals in sections of track where the minimum stopping distance for trains was shorter than the distance between signals. He had given "line clear" for the express train to the preceding signal box before receiving the required clearance from the following signal box.

Instead, he should have sent a "blocking back inside home signal" message to Bentley Heath, the preceding signal box, so that the express train could have been slowed in plenty of time by the Bentley Heath distant signal at caution. However, it was not determined at the enquiry whether the signalman had cleared the express before or after allowing the conflicting freight movement. This may have been academic if the express had been cleared before the freight train was permitted to foul the up main line, even if Regulation 4A had been obeyed.

The express train was normally formed by a Blue Pullman multiple unit, an experimental type of new luxury train built for pullman services, but this regular train had to be taken out of service and replaced by the stand-by diesel hydraulic.

One of the drivers killed in the accident was Ernie Morris, one of the first drivers to be certified on the Blue Pullman sets, and who had featured in the 1962 British Transport Film "Lets Go To Birmingham", a driver's eye view of the Blue Pullman sets on a run from London Paddington to Birmingham Snow Hill.

Two drivers were required on this working and the other driver killed was Sid Bench.

The second man, also killed, was David Corkery who was only on the train to cover for the rostered man who had gone sick. David left a widow and two young children.

See also
List of rail accidents in the United Kingdom

References

External links
 Accident at Knowle & Dorridge on 15 August 1963, Railways Archive.co.uk

Railway accidents and incidents in the West Midlands (county)
Railway accidents and incidents in Warwickshire
Railway accidents in 1963
1963 disasters in the United Kingdom
1963 in England
20th century in Warwickshire
Accidents and incidents involving British Rail
August 1963 events in the United Kingdom
Railway accidents caused by signaller's error